Rajavaram is a village in Rowthulapudi Mandal, Kakinada district in the state of Andhra Pradesh in India.

Geography 

Demographics 
 India census, Rajavarama had a population of 1,199, out of which 596 were male and 603 were female. Population of children below 6 years of age were 153. The literacy rate of the village is 42.64%.

References 

Villages in Rowthulapudi mandal